The Navua River is located in the island of Viti Levu in Fiji and has its source on the south east slope of Mount Gordon and flows for 65 kilometers to the south coast. It is noted for the scenic beauty of the rugged mountain country through which it flows.
In the late 19th century a sugar mill was built on the banks of this river, and although the mill was shut down in 1923, the town of Navua stands on its site.

Upper Navua Conservation Area
The Upper Navua Conservation Area is an area in the central highlands of Viti Levu where the Navua River passes through a narrow gorge. It is managed by the Fiji Native Land Trust Board. The area was listed as a "Wetland of International Importance" under the Ramsar Convention on April 11, 2006.

References

Rivers of Viti Levu
Ramsar sites in Fiji